Denmark participated in the Eurovision Song Contest 2005 with the song "Talking to You" written by Jacob Launbjerg and Andreas Mørck. The song was performed by Jakob Sveistrup. The Danish broadcaster DR organised the national final Dansk Melodi Grand Prix 2005 in order to select the Danish entry for the 2005 contest in Kyiv, Ukraine. Ten songs competed in a televised show where "Tænder på dig" performed by Jakob Sveistrup was the winner as decided upon through two rounds of public voting. The song was later translated from Danish to English for the Eurovision Song Contest and was titled "Talking to You".

Denmark competed in the semi-final of the Eurovision Song Contest which took place on 19 May 2005. Performing during the show in position 24, "Talking to You" was announced among the top 10 entries of the semi-final and therefore qualified to compete in the final on 21 May. It was later revealed that Denmark placed third out of the 25 participating countries in the semi-final with 185 points. In the final, Denmark performed in position 13 and placed ninth out of the 24 participating countries, scoring 125 points.

Background 

Prior to the 2005 contest, Denmark had participated in the Eurovision Song Contest thirty-three times since its first entry in 1957. In the 2004 contest, "Shame on You" performed by Tomas Thordarson failed to qualify Denmark to the final.

The Danish national broadcaster, DR, broadcasts the event within Denmark and organises the selection process for the nation's entry. DR confirmed their intentions to participate at the 2005 Eurovision Song Contest on 11 August 2004. Denmark has selected all of their Eurovision entries through the national final Dansk Melodi Grand Prix. Along with their participation confirmation, the broadcaster announced that Dansk Melodi Grand Prix 2005 would be organised in order to select Denmark's entry for the 2005 contest.

Before Eurovision

Dansk Melodi Grand Prix 2005 
Dansk Melodi Grand Prix 2005 was the 35th edition of Dansk Melodi Grand Prix, the music competition that selects Denmark's entries for the Eurovision Song Contest. The event was held on 12 February 2005 at the Forum Horsens in Horsens, hosted by Birthe Kjær, Annette Heick and Jarl Friis-Mikkelsen and televised on DR1 as well as streamed online at the official DR website. The national final was watched by 1.918 million viewers in Denmark.

Competing entries 
DR opened a submission period between 11 August 2004 and 10 October 2004 for composers to submit their entries. All composers and lyricists were required to be Danish citizens or have been registered as a Danish resident from 12 August 2004 to 21 May 2004. For the first time, songs could be performed in other languages other than Danish. The broadcaster received 236 entries during the submission period. A selection committee selected ten songs from the entries submitted to the broadcaster, while the artists of the selected entries were chosen by DR in consultation with their composers. The competing artists and songs were announced on 9 December 2004 and among the artists was the Olsen Brothers who won the 2000 Eurovision Song Contest.

Final 
The final took place on 12 February 2005 where the winner was determined over two rounds of public voting. In the first round of voting the top five advanced to the superfinal. In the superfinal, the winner, "Tænder på dig" performed by Jakob Sveistrup, was selected. Viewers were able to vote via telephone or SMS and the telephone voting results of each of Denmark's four regions as well as the SMS voting results in the superfinal were converted to points which were each distributed as follows: 8, 10 and 12 points.

At Eurovision 
According to Eurovision rules, all nations with the exceptions of the host country, the "Big Four" (France, Germany, Spain and the United Kingdom), and the ten highest placed finishers in the 2004 contest are required to qualify from the semi-final on 19 May 2005 in order to compete for the final on 21 May 2005; the top ten countries from the semi-final progress to the final. On 22 March 2005, a special allocation draw was held which determined the running order for the semi-final and Denmark was set to perform in position 24, following the entry from Slovenia and before the entry from Poland. Jakob Sveistrup performed the English version of "Tænder på dig" at the contest, titled "Talking to You". At the end of the semi-final, Denmark was announced as having finished in the top 10 and subsequently qualifying for the grand final. It was later revealed that Denmark placed third in the semi-final, receiving a total of 185 points. The draw for the running order for the final was done by the presenters during the announcement of the ten qualifying countries during the semi-final and Denmark was drawn to perform in position 13, following the entry from Serbia and Montenegro and before the entry from Sweden. Denmark placed ninth in the final, scoring 125 points.

The semi-final and final were broadcast on DR1 with commentary by Jørgen de Mylius. The Danish spokesperson, who announced the Danish votes during the final, was 1983 Danish Eurovision entrant Gry Johansen. The semi-final of the contest was watched by a total of 832 thousand viewers in Denmark, while the final was watched by 1.3 million viewers.

Voting 
Below is a breakdown of points awarded to Denmark and awarded by Denmark in the semi-final and grand final of the contest. The nation awarded its 12 points to Norway in the semi-final and the final of the contest.

Points awarded to Denmark

Points awarded by Denmark

References

2005
Countries in the Eurovision Song Contest 2005
Eurovision
Eurovision